The Himachal Pradesh Handball Association (HPHA) is an organisation which manages and controls the sport of Handball in the Indian state of Himachal Pradesh.

About

The Himachal Pradesh Handball Association (HPHA) is an organisation which govern and control the sport of handball in the state of Himachal Pradesh. HPHA is affiliated to Handball Federation of India. Team selected by the HPHA take part in National Championship held under the aegis of the Handball Federation of India. Himachal Pradesh Women And Junior Girls teams are currently Silver Medalists of National Championships.

References

External links

Handball in India
Handball governing bodies in India
Sports governing bodies in India